The discography of DJ Fresh, an English drum and bass and dubstep producer and DJ, consists of three studio albums and 29 singles.

On 1 August 2010 he re-released his song "Gold Dust" featuring vocals from Ce'Cile, whereafter it peaked at 22 in the UK and 39 in Ireland, marking his first Top 40 hit in both countries. On 16 August, he released his second studio album, Kryptonite which peaked at 4 on the UK Dance Chart. He then released his follow-up single, called "Lassitude" with Sigma and vocals from Koko. It peaked at 98 on the UK Singles Chart and 11 on the UK Dance Chart.

"Louder", the first single from his third album Nextlevelism, was released on 3 July 2011. The song was used as part of a Lucozade Lite advertising campaign in the UK and Ireland. The song features vocals from Welsh singer Sian Evans and peaked number 4 on the Irish Singles Chart and was his first ever number one on the UK Singles Chart. On 12 February 2012, the second single "Hot Right Now", featuring British singer Rita Ora, became his second number one in the UK, and the first drum and bass song to chart at number one in the UK. The third single from the album, "The Power", which features rapper Dizzee Rascal, was officially released on 3 June 2012 it debuted and peaked at number 6 on the UK Singles Chart. The fourth single, "The Feeling", which features RaVaughn, was officially released on 23 September 2012 it debuted and peaked at number 13 in the UK. Nextlevelism was released on 1 October 2012, peaking at number 14 on the UK Albums Chart.

Albums

Studio albums

Compilation albums

Extended plays

Singles

As lead artist

As featured artist

Promotional singles

Remixes

Collaborations and other releases

Production credits

Music videos

References

Discographies of British artists
Electronic music discographies